Graham Bruce Hancock (born 2 August 1950) is a British writer who promotes pseudoscientific theories involving many ancient civilizations and lost lands. Hancock speculates that an advanced ice age civilization was destroyed in a cataclysm, but that its survivors passed on their knowledge to hunter-gatherers, giving rise to the earliest known civilizations of ancient Egypt, Mesopotamia, and Mesoamerica.

Born in Edinburgh, Hancock studied sociology at Durham University before working as a journalist, writing for a number of British newspapers and magazines. His first three books dealt with international development, including Lords of Poverty (1989), a well-received critique of corruption in the aid system. Beginning with The Sign and the Seal in 1992, he shifted focus to speculative accounts of human prehistory and ancient civilisations, on which he has written a dozen books, most notably Fingerprints of the Gods and Magicians of the Gods. His ideas have been the subject of several films, including the Netflix series Ancient Apocalypse (2022), and Hancock makes regular appearances on the podcast The Joe Rogan Experience to discuss them. He has also written two fantasy novels and in 2013 delivered a controversial TEDx talk promoting the use of the psychoactive drink ayahuasca.

Reviews of Hancock's interpretations of archaeological evidence and historic documents have identified them as a form of pseudoarchaeology or pseudohistory containing confirmation bias supporting  preconceived conclusions by ignoring context, cherry picking, or misinterpreting evidence, and withholding critical countervailing data. His writings have neither undergone scholarly peer review nor been published in academic journals.

Early life and education
Graham Bruce Hancock was born in Edinburgh, Scotland. He moved with his parents to India at the age of three, where his father worked as a surgeon. Having returned to the UK, he graduated from Durham University with a degree in sociology in 1973.

Career
As a journalist, Hancock worked for many British papers, such as The Times, The Sunday Times, The Independent, and The Guardian. He co-edited New Internationalist magazine from 1976 to 1979, and was the East Africa correspondent of The Economist from 1981 to 1983. 

Prior to 1990, Hancock's works dealt mainly with problems of economic and social development. Since 1990, his works have focused mainly on speculative connections he makes between various archaeological, historical, and cross-cultural phenomena. He has stated that from about 1987 he was "pretty much permanently stoned ... and I felt that it helped me with my work as a writer, and perhaps at some point it did".

His books include Lords of Poverty, The Sign and the Seal, Fingerprints of the Gods, Keeper of Genesis (released in the US as Message of the Sphinx), The Mars Mystery, Heaven's Mirror (with wife Santha Faiia), Underworld: The Mysterious Origins of Civilization, and Talisman: Sacred Cities, Secret Faith (with co-author Robert Bauval). In 1996, he appeared in The Mysterious Origins of Man. He also wrote and presented the documentaries Underworld: Flooded Kingdoms of the Ice Age (2002) and Quest for the Lost Civilisation (1998).

In Hancock's book Talisman: Sacred Cities, Secret Faith, co-authored with Robert Bauval, the two put forward what sociologist of religion David V. Barrett called "a version of the old Jewish-Masonic plot so beloved by ultra-right-wing conspiracy theorists." They suggest a connection between the pillars of Solomon's Temple and the Twin Towers, and between the Star of David and The Pentagon. A contemporary review of Talisman by David V. Barrett for The Independent pointed to a lack of originality as well as basic factual errors, concluding that it was "a mish-mash of badly-connected, half-argued theories". In a 2008 piece for The Telegraph referencing Talisman, Damian Thompson described Hancock and Bauval as fantasists.

Hancock's Supernatural: Meetings With the Ancient Teachers of Mankind, was published in the UK in October 2005 and in the US in 2006.  In it, Hancock examines paleolithic cave art in the light of David Lewis-Williams' neuropsychological model, exploring its relation to the development of the fully modern human mind.

In 2015, his Magicians of the Gods: The Forgotten Wisdom of Earth's Lost Civilization was published by St. Martin's Press.

His first novel, Entangled: The Eater of Souls, the first in a fantasy series, was published in the UK in April 2010 and in the US in October 2010. The novel makes use of Hancock's prior research interests and as he has noted, "What was there to lose, I asked myself, when my critics already described my factual books as fiction?"

Pseudoarchaeology
Hancock does not agree with archaeologists that the earliest known civilizations arose independently. He speculates that there was an advanced civilization during the last ice age; that it was destroyed in a natural cataclysm during the Younger Dryas; and that its few survivors travelled the world introducing agriculture, monumental architecture and astronomy to hunter-gatherers, giving rise to civilizations like ancient Egypt, Mesopotamia, and Mesoamerica. Hancock argues that evidence is found in ancient monuments, which he believes are much older than archaeologists say, and also in myths like Atlantis. He recycles the ideas American congressman Ignatius Donnelly put forward in his book Atlantis: The Antediluvian World (1882), which have been long discredited. Archaeologist Flint Dibble says Hancock's claims "reinforce white supremacist ideas, stripping Indigenous people of their rich heritage and instead giving credit to aliens or white people".

Hancock's claims and methods are regarded as pseudoarchaeology. In Archaeological Fantasies Garrett G. Fagan points out that pseudoarchaeologists cherry pick evidence and misrepresent known facts. When apparently factual claims in their works are investigated it turns out that "quotes are presented out of context, critical countervailing data is withheld, the state of understanding is misrepresented, or critical archaeological information about context is ignored". Fagan gives two typical examples from Hancock's book Fingerprints of the Gods (1995):

 Hancock wrote that "the best recent evidence suggests that" large regions of Antarctica may have been ice-free until about 6,000 years ago, referring to the Piri Reis map and Hapgood's work from the 1960s. What is left entirely unmentioned are the extensive studies of the Antarctic ice sheet by George H. Denton, published in 1981, which showed the ice to be hundreds of thousands of years old.
 When discussing the ancient Bolivian city of Tiwanaku, Hancock presents it as a "mysterious site about which very little is known" and that "minimal archaeology has been done over the years", suggesting that it may date to 17,000 years ago. Yet in the years prior to these statements dozens of studies had been published, major excavations were conducted and the site was radiocarbon dated by three sets of samples to around 1500 BC.
The Maya are portrayed by Hancock as only "semi-civilized" and their achievements as "generally unremarkable" to support the thesis that they inherited their calendar from a much older, far more advanced civilization.

Orion correlation theory 

One of the many recurring themes in several of Hancock's works has been an exposition on Robert Bauval's Orion correlation theory (OCT). OCT posits that the relative locations of the three largest pyramids of the Giza pyramid complex were chosen by the builders to reflect the three stars of Orion's Belt of the constellation Orion. The pyramids are aligned to the cardinal direction within a fraction of a degree, however they are mismatched with Orion's Belt exceeding five degrees, noted astronomer Tony Fairall.

The Message of the Sphinx (1996)
The Message of the Sphinx: A Quest for the Hidden Legacy of Mankind (Keeper of Genesis in the United Kingdom) is a pseudoarchaeology book written by Hancock and Robert Bauval in 1996 which argues that the creation of the Sphinx and Pyramids occurred as far back as 10,500 BC using astronomical data. Working from the premise that the Giza pyramid complex encodes a message, the book begins with the fringe Sphinx water erosion hypothesis, evidence that the authors believe suggests that deep erosion patterns on the flanks of the Sphinx were caused by thousands of years of heavy rain. The authors go on to suggest, using computer simulations of the sky, that the pyramids, representing the three stars of Orion's Belt, along with associated causeways and alignments, constitute a record in stone of the celestial array at the vernal equinox in 10,500 BC. This moment, they contend, represents Zep Tepi, the "First Time", often referred to in the hieroglyphic record. They state that the initiation rituals of the Egyptian pharaohs replicate on Earth the sun's journey through the stars in this remote era, and they suggest that the "Hall of Records" of a lost civilisation may be located by treating the Giza Plateau as a template of these same ancient skies.

Atlantis Reborn (1999) 
Hancock and Bauval's Orion correlation theory was the subject of Atlantis Reborn, an episode of the BBC documentary series Horizon broadcast in 1999. The programme was critical of the theory, demonstrating that the constellation Leo could be found amongst famous landmarks in New York, and alleging that Hancock had selectively moved or ignored the locations of temples to support his argument. It concluded that "as long as you have enough points and you don't need to make every point fit, you can find virtually any pattern you want."

Following the broadcast, Hancock and Bauval complained to the Broadcasting Standards Commission, but the commission found that "the programme makers acted in good faith in their examination of the theories". One complaint was upheld: that the programme unfairly omitted one of their arguments in rebuttal of astronomer Edwin Krupp. The following year the BBC broadcast a revised version of the episode, Atlantis Reborn Again, in which Hancock and Bauval provided further rebuttals to Krupp.

Ancient Apocalypse (2022) 

Hancock's theories are the basis of Ancient Apocalypse, a 2022 documentary series produced by Netflix, where Hancock's son Sean is "senior manager of unscripted originals". In the series, Hancock argues that an advanced ice age civilization was destroyed in a cataclysm, but that its survivors introduced agriculture, monumental architecture and astronomy to hunter-gatherers around the world. He attempts to show how several ancient monuments are evidence of this, and claims that archaeologists are ignoring or covering-up this alleged evidence. It incorporates ideas from the Comet Research Group (CRG), including the controversial Younger Dryas impact hypothesis. 

Archaeologists and other experts have described the theories presented in the series as lacking in evidence and easily disproven. It has been criticised for failing to present alternative hypotheses or contradicting evidence, and for unfounded accusations that "mainstream archaeology" conspires against Hancock's ideas. Archaeologists have linked Hancock's claims to "racist" and "white supremacist" ideologies from the 19th century, which they say are insulting to the ancestors of indigenous peoples who built the monuments. A Maltese archaeologist who appeared in the episode said that her interview had been manipulated. The Society for American Archaeology (SAA) objected to the classification of the series as a documentary and requested that Netflix reclassify it as science fiction. The SAA also stated that the series

Other media appearances 
Hancock gave a TEDx lecture titled "The War on Consciousness", in which he described his use of ayahuasca, an Amazonian brew containing a hallucinogenic compound DMT, and argued that adults should be allowed to responsibly use it for self-improvement and spiritual growth. He stated that for 24 years he was "pretty much permanently stoned" on cannabis, and that in 2011, six years after his first use of ayahuasca, it enabled him to stop using cannabis. At the recommendation of TED's Science Board, the lecture was removed from the TEDx YouTube channel and moved to TED's main website where it "can be framed to highlight both [Hancock's] provocative ideas and the factual problems with [his] arguments".

Hancock has appeared on The Joe Rogan Experience podcast several times.

In popular culture
In 2009, Roland Emmerich released his blockbuster disaster movie 2012, citing Fingerprints of the Gods in the credits as an inspiration for the film, stating: "I always wanted to do a biblical flood movie, but I never felt I had the hook. I first read about the Earth's Crust Displacement Theory in Graham Hancock's Fingerprints of the Gods."

Works

Books
 
 
 
 
 
   Published in the United Kingdom as 
 
 
 
 
 
 
 
 
 
Hancock, Graham (2019). America Before: The Key to Earth's Lost Civilization. St. Martin's Press. .

Video
 Michael Palin's Pole to Pole – Crossing the Line (EP 5) (1992)
 Quest for the Lost Civilization – Acorn Media (1998)
 Atlantis Reborn Again – BBC Horizon (2000)
 Earth Pilgrims – Earth Pilgrims Inc. (2010)
 "The War on Consciousness" – TEDx (2013)

References

Works cited

Further reading

External links
 
 
 Horizon: Atlantis Reborn and the Broadcasting Standards Commission – The BBC's response to the Horizon programme debate

1950 births
Living people
20th-century British writers
21st-century British writers
Alumni of St Cuthbert's Society, Durham
Atlantis proponents
British male writers
British psychedelic drug advocates
Pseudoarchaeologists
Pseudohistorians
Psychedelic drug researchers
Scottish journalists
Writers from Edinburgh